Kharalambos Potamianos (born 1907, date of death unknown) was a Greek sailor. He competed in the Star event at the 1948 Summer Olympics.

References

External links
 

1907 births
Year of death missing
Greek male sailors (sport)
Olympic sailors of Greece
Sailors at the 1948 Summer Olympics – Star
People from Argostoli
Date of death unknown
Sportspeople from the Ionian Islands (region)